The 17th Dallas–Fort Worth Film Critics Association Awards honoring the best in film for 2011 were announced on December 16, 2011. These awards "recognizing extraordinary accomplishment in film" are presented annually by the Dallas–Fort Worth Film Critics Association (DFWFCA), based in the Dallas–Fort Worth metroplex region of Texas. The organization, founded in 1990, includes 29 film critics for print, radio, television, and internet publications based in north Texas. The Dallas–Fort Worth Film Critics Association began presenting its annual awards list in 1991.

The Descendants was the DFWFCA's most awarded film of 2011 taking top honors in the Best Picture, Best Actor (George Clooney), Best Supporting Actress (Shailene Woodley), Best Director (Alexander Payne), and Best Screenplay (Alexander Payne, Nat Faxon, and Jim Rash) categories. This continued a trend of critics groups across the United States giving their top prizes to the film about a family dealing with betrayal, loss, and change.

No other film earned multiple 2011 honors from the critics association. Beginners earned Christopher Plummer the Best Supporting Actor honor for his performance as Hal. The other acting award went to Michelle Williams as Best Actress for her leading role as Marilyn Monroe in My Week with Marilyn. His work on The Tree of Life earned Emmanuel Lubezki the honor for Best Cinematography. The remaining film honors went to Rango as Best Animated Film, Cave of Forgotten Dreams as Best Documentary, and Iran's A Separation as Best Foreign Language Film.

Along with the 11 "best of" category awards, the group also presented the Russell Smith Award to We Need to Talk About Kevin as the "best low-budget or cutting-edge independent film" of the year. The award is named in honor of late Dallas Morning News film critic Russell Smith.

Winners
Winners are listed first and highlighted with boldface. Other films ranked by the annual poll are listed in order. While most categories saw 5 honorees named, some categories ranged from as many as 10 (Best Film) to as few as 2 (Best Cinematography, Best Animated Film, Best Screenplay).

Category awards

Individual awards

Russell Smith Award
 We Need to Talk About Kevin, for "best low-budget or cutting-edge independent film"

References

External links
 Dallas–Fort Worth Film Critics Association official website

2011
2011 film awards